360 bus may refer to:

London Buses route 360
West Midlands bus route 360